P'aqla Tanka (Quechua p'aqla bald, tanka a deep bifurcation, fork, also spelled Pagletanca) is a mountain in the Andes of Peru, about  high. It is located in the Huánuco Region, Ambo Province, San Rafael District. P'aqla Tanka lies southwest of Ashu Hanka.

References

Mountains of Peru
Mountains of Huánuco Region